Faolán Mac an Ghabhann na Scéal, died 1423, was an Irish writer and genealogist. He was one of the ten scribes of Leabhar Ua Maine, commissioned by Archbishop of Tuam, Muircertach Ó Ceallaigh (died 1407). His poem, Adham ar n-athair uile is penned in the text by Ádhamh Cúisín. Nothing else seems to be known of him.

See also

 An Leabhar Muimhneach
 Irish genealogy
 Leabhar Adhamh Ó Cianáin
 Leabhar Cloinne Maoil Ruanaidh
 Leabhar na nGenealach
 Ó Cléirigh Book of Genealogies
 Rawlinson B 502

References
 The Book of Uí Maine, with introduction and indexes by R.A.S. Macalister, collotype facsimile Dublin, 1941
 The Book of Uí Mhaine, R.A. Breatnach, in Great books of Ireland, Thomas Davis Lectures, Dublin, 1967
 The Ó Cellaigh Rulers of Uí Maine - A Genealogical Fragment, c.1400, (Part 1), Nollaig Ó Muraíle, Journal of the Galway Archaeological and Historical Society, pp. 32–77, volume 60, 2008
 Compilations of lore and legend: Leabhar na hUidhre and the Books of Uí Mhaine, Ballymote, Lecan and Fermoy, John Carey, in Bernadette Cunningham and Siobhán Fitzpatrick (eds), Treasures … Dublin, 2009, pp. 17–31.

External links
 https://soundcloud.com/the-royal-irish-academy/nollaig-mura-le-mria-dias-some?in=the-royal-irish-academy/sets/book-of-ui-mhaine-conference
 https://www.ria.ie/sites/default/files/nollaig_o_muraile_ui_mhaine_handout.pdf_0.pdf

15th-century Irish poets
15th-century Irish writers
People from County Galway
People from County Tipperary
Irish scribes
Medieval European scribes
Irish genealogists
Irish-language writers
Irish scholars and academics